A regional school unit is a type of school district in Maine.

They were created starting in 2008 pursuant to a change in Maine Law that attempted to save on administrative costs by consolidating Maine's many school districts into larger districts. This change was championed by Governor John Baldacci.

Despite a deadline of January 30, 2009, many voters rejected their local school consolidation plans, citing issues such as loss of local control and higher costs due to bringing lower-paid teachers up to parity. For example, Brewer faced an annual loss of $244,000 in state subsidies for rejecting the consolidation plan, but potentially a loss of $2.74 million in increased salaries over the first 3 years if it had been approved.

, 77 RSUs had been formed.

List of RSUs

 RSU 1 - LKRSU – Arrowsic, Bath, Phippsburg, Woolwich
 RSU 2 – Dresden, Farmingdale, Hallowell, Monmouth, Richmond
 RSU 3 (coextensive with MSAD 3) – Brooks, Freedom, Jackson, Knox, Liberty, Monroe, Montville, Thorndike, Troy, Unity, Waldo
 RSU 4 – Litchfield, Sabattus, Wales
 RSU 5 – Durham, Freeport, Pownal
 RSU 6 (coextensive with MSAD 6) – Buxton, Frye Island, Hollis, Limington, Standish
 RSU 7 (coextensive with MSAD 7) – North Haven
 RSU 8 (coextensive with MSAD 8) – Vinalhaven
 RSU 9 – Chesterville, Farmington, Industry, New Sharon, New Vineyard, Starks, Temple, Vienna, Weld, Wilton
 RSU 10 – Buckfield, Hanover, Hartford, Mexico, Roxbury, Rumford, Sumner
 RSU 11 (coextensive with MSAD 11) – Gardiner, Pittston, Randolph, West Gardiner
 RSU 12 – Alna, Chelsea, Palermo, Somerville, Westport, Whitefield, Windsor
 RSU 13 – Cushing, Owls Head, Rockland, South Thomaston, Thomaston
 RSU 14 – Raymond, Windham
 RSU 15 (coextensive with MSAD 15) – Gray, New Gloucester
 RSU 16 – Mechanic Falls, Minot, Poland
 RSU 17 (coextensive with MSAD 17) – Harrison, Hebron, Norway, Otisfield, Oxford, Paris, Waterford, West Paris
 RSU 18 – Belgrade, China, Oakland, Rome, Sidney
 RSU 19 – Corinna, Dixmont, Etna, Hartland, Newport, Palmyra, Plymouth, Saint Albans
 RSU 20 – Searsport, Stockton Springs
 RSU 21 – Arundel, Kennebunk, Kennebunkport
 RSU 22 – Frankfort, Hampden, Newburgh, Winterport
 RSU 23 – Old Orchard Beach
 RSU 24 – Eastbrook, Franklin, Gouldsboro, Mariaville, Sorrento, Steuben, Sullivan, Waltham, Winter Harbor
 RSU 25 – Bucksport, Orland, Prospect, Verona
 RSU 26 – Orono
 RSU 28 (coextensive with MSAD 28) – Camden, Rockport
 RSU 29 (coextensive with MSAD 29) – Hammond, Houlton, Littleton, Monticello
 RSU 30 (coextensive with MSAD 30) – Lee, Springfield, Webster Plantation, Winn
 RSU 31 (coextensive with MSAD 31) – Edinburg, Enfield, Howland, Maxfield, Passadumkeag
 RSU 32 (coextensive with MSAD 32) – Ashland, Garfield Plantation, Masardis
 RSU 33 (coextensive with MSAD 33) – Frenchville, Saint Agatha
 RSU 34 – Alton, Bradley, Old Town
 RSU 35 (coextensive with MSAD 35) – Eliot, South Berwick
 RSU 37 (coextensive with MSAD 37) – Addison, Columbia, Columbia Falls, Harrington, Milbridge
 RSU 38 – Manchester, Mount Vernon, Readfield, Wayne
 RSU 39 – Caribou, Stockholm
 RSU 40 (coextensive with MSAD 40) – Friendship, Union, Waldoboro, Warren, Washington
 RSU 41 (coextensive with MSAD 41) – Brownville, Lagrange, Milo
 RSU 42 (coextensive with MSAD 42) – Blaine, Mars Hill
 RSU 44 (coextensive with MSAD 44) – Bethel, Greenwood, Newry, Woodstock
 RSU 45 (coextensive with MSAD 45) – Perham, Wade, Washburn
 RSU 49 (coextensive with MSAD 49) – Albion, Benton, Clinton, Fairfield
 RSU 50 – Crystal, Dyer Brook, Hersey, Island Falls, Merrill, Oakfield, Smyrna
 RSU 51 (coextensive with MSAD 51) – Cumberland, North Yarmouth
 RSU 52 (coextensive with MSAD 52) – Greene, Leeds, Turner
 RSU 53 (coextensive with MSAD 53) – Burnham, Detroit, Pittsfield
 RSU 54 (coextensive with MSAD 54) – Canaan, Cornville, Mercer, Norridgewock, Skowhegan, Smithfield
 RSU 55 (coextensive with MSAD 55) – Baldwin, Cornish, Hiram, Parsonsfield, Porter
 RSU 56 – Canton, Carthage, Dixfield, Peru
 RSU 57 (coextensive with MSAD 57) – Alfred, Limerick, Lyman, Newfield, Shapleigh, Waterboro
 RSU 58 (coextensive with MSAD 58) – Avon, Kingfield, Phillips, Strong
 RSU 59 (coextensive with MSAD 59) – Madison
 RSU 60 (coextensive with MSAD 60) – Berwick, Lebanon, North Berwick
 RSU 61 (coextensive with MSAD 61) – Bridgton, Casco, Naples
 RSU 63 (coextensive with MSAD 63) – Clifton, Eddington, Holden
 RSU 64 (coextensive with MSAD 64) – Bradford, Corinth, Hudson, Kenduskeag, Stetson
 RSU 65 (coextensive with MSAD 65) – Matinicus Isle Plantation
 RSU 67 – Chester, Lincoln, Mattawamkeag
 RSU 68 (coextensive with MSAD 68) – Charleston, Dover-Foxcroft, Monson, Sebec
 RSU 70 (coextensive with MSAD 70) – Amity, Haynesville, Hodgdon, Linneus, Ludlow, New Limerick
 RSU 71 – Belfast, Belmont, Morrill, Searsmont, Swanville
 RSU 72 (coextensive with MSAD 72) – Brownfield, Denmark, Fryeburg, Lovell, Stoneham, Stow, Sweden
 RSU 73 – Jay, Livermore, Livermore Falls
 RSU 74 (coextensive with MSAD 74) – Anson, Embden, New Portland, Solon
 RSU 75 (coextensive with MSAD 75) – Bowdoin, Bowdoinham, Harpswell, Topsham
 RSU 78 – Dallas Plantation, Magalloway, Rengeley, Rangeley Plantation, Sandy River Plantation
 RSU 79 (coextensive with MSAD 1) – Castle Hill, Chapman, Mapleton, Presque Isle, Westfield
 RSU 80 (coextensive with MSAD 4) – Abbot, Cambridge, Guilford, Parkman, Sangerville, Wellington
 RSU 82 (coextensive with MSAD 12) – Jackman, Moose River
 RSU 83 (coextensive with MSAD 13) – Bingham, Moscow
 RSU 84 (coextensive with MSAD 14) – Danforth, Weston
 RSU 85 (coextensive with MSAD 19) – Lubec
 RSU 86 (coextensive with MSAD 20) – Fort Fairfield
 RSU 87 (coextensive with MSAD 23) – Carmel, Levant
 RSU 88 (coextensive with MSAD 24) – Cyr Plantation, Hamlin, Van Buren
 RSU 89 – Mount Chase, Patten, Sherman, Stacyville

References

External links
 School Administrative Reorganization, Maine Department of Education
 An Act To Remove Barriers to the Reorganization of School Administrative Units
 PL 668

Education in Maine